W. W. Sabin (1861–1939) was an architect in Cleveland, Ohio, United States. He practiced in the city from 1888–1923.

Projects

 Dr. William Gifford House at 3047 Prospect Avenue in Cleveland. Listed on the National Register of Historic Places (NRHP).
 First Church of Christ in Euclid at 16200 Euclid Avenue in East Cleveland. Listed on the NRHP.
 Henry Graefe House in Sandusky at 1429 Columbus Ave in Sandusky. Listed on the NRHP 1982. 
 Antioch Baptist Church (1896-1900), 8869 Cedar Avenue  
 Eldred Hall at Case Western Reserve University, a 3-story English Gothic style building "faced with sandstone". The first floor is finished in oak, and the second and third floors are finished in maple and Georgia pine. It contained a cafeteria, barber shop, and auditorium. Expanded in 1938 by the architectural firm of Garfield, Harris, Robinson & Schafer.

References

1861 births
1939 deaths
Architects from Cleveland